The Architectural Heritage Fund (AHF) is a registered charity (No. 266780) founded in 1976 to promote the conservation and re-use of historic buildings across the United Kingdom. The AHF provides communities with advice, grants and loans to help them find enterprising and sustainable ways to revitalise the old buildings they love, particularly in economically disadvantaged areas. For over 40 years, it has been the leading social investor in creating new futures for historic buildings.

Scope
To apply for an AHF grant, organisations must be a not-for-private-profit organisation or one of the lowest tiers of the local government.

The AHF provides loan finance to formally constituted incorporated charities, community businesses or social enterprises whose members have limited liability.

Buildings supported must be of historic or architectural importance – they may be listed, in a conservation area, or of special significance to the community.

As of 2020, the AHF had awarded loans with a total value of £125m to over 890 projects across the United Kingdom and disbursed more than 750 individual grants with a total value of over £10M.

Legal status
The fund is incorporated as a company limited by guarantee without a share capital and registered at Companies House number 01150304.

Example projects
Some of the projects the AHF has supported include:
Jubilee Pool, Penzance, Cornwall, England
Riddel's Warehouse, Belfast, County Antrim, Northern Ireland
Circus Eruption, Swansea, Wales
Midsteeple Quarter, Dumfries, Dumfries and Galloway, Scotland
170-175 High Street West, Sunderland, Tyne and Wear, England
The Woolstore, Caledon, County Tyrone, Northern Ireland
Haverhub, Haverfordwest, Pembrokeshire, Wales
Fruitmarket Gallery, Edinburgh, Scotland

List of all case studies:
https://ahfund.org.uk/news/case-studies/

Further reading 
Weir, Hilary. How to Rescue a Ruin - by setting up a local buildings preservation trust. 1990. 
Waterson, Merlin; Morrison, Ian. Rescue and Reuse: Communities, Heritage and Architecture. 2019. 
The Guardian. From a Debenhams to a creative hub: closed stores get new lease in community life.
The Guardian. With tourism booming, Great Yarmouth dreams of turning the tide.
The Times. Former banks are given new lease of life.
UK Fundraising. Architectural Heritage Foundation launches £7m loan & social investment fund.
BBC News Northern Ireland. Regeneration: The NI villages bringing new life to old buildings.

See also 
Building Preservation Trust
Building Preservation and Conservation Trusts in the UK
U.K. Association of Building Preservation Trusts
National Lottery Heritage Fund
Historic England
Historic Environment Scotland
Cadw
Department for Communities
Social Investment Business

References

External links 
AHF Official Website.

Conservation in the United Kingdom
Heritage organizations
Charities based in London
History organisations based in the United Kingdom